Philippe Vernet (born 19 May 1961) is a French former cyclist. He competed in the sprint event at the 1984 Summer Olympics.

References

External links
 

1961 births
Living people
French male cyclists
Olympic cyclists of France
Cyclists at the 1984 Summer Olympics
Cyclists from Paris